Pinelands is an outer northern suburb of Palmerston, Northern Territory, Australia. It is 21 km southeast of the Darwin CBD and 2.1 km from Palmerston City. Its local government area is the City of Palmerston.

The area is one of Palmerston's industrial suburbs, along with Yarrawonga.

References

Suburbs of Darwin, Northern Territory